Edubridge International School is an international school at Grant Road (East) in south Mumbai, India, not far from Chowpatty Beach. It was authorised as a World School in February 2014 by the International Baccalaureate. Edubridge International School offers only IB programmes, and the school was authorized to teach the Middle Years Programme (MYP) in 2015 and to teach the Primary Years Programme (PYP) in 2016. Edubridge is a co-educational day school. The school is located in a historic building that was constructed in 1908 and named after Robert Cotton Money, a 19th-century British educationalist.

See also 
 List of schools in Mumbai

References

External links 

Private schools in Mumbai
International schools in Mumbai
Educational institutions established in 2013
2013 establishments in Maharashtra